Madurai Veeran is a 2007 Indian Tamil-language action romance film directed by Vincent Selva. The film stars Jithan Ramesh and Saloni Aswani. The score and soundtrack are composed by Srikanth Deva. The film is the Tamil remake of the 2001 Telugu film Nuvvu Nenu directed by Teja. Selva and Ramesh previously collobarorated for Jithan (2005) and this film was also successful at the box office. Jithan Ramesh's voice is dubbed by his brother Jiiva.

Plot
Shiva is the only son of a rich businessman. He grows up surrounded by money and he is not cared for by his parents, due to his mother dying when he was a young boy and his father is business-minded and only cares about his money. Shiva and his friends are playful and athletic, and do not study. Priya, who also goes to the same college (the college was created and run by Shiva's family) Shiva attends, is the daughter of a cow herder and a gangster Mayandi. Priya keeps her distance from Shiva, but as the film progresses, they inevitably become friends. Their friendship then develops into romance, but this love is opposed by both their parents. Both their parents try to separate them, they try to get them married of to different people. They eventually run away together, and a hit man is after Priya's life (hired by Shiva's father). In a confrontation with the hit-man, Shiva gets wounded but defeats the hit man, storms into his father's office, and throws the hit-man at him. He then informs his father of his wedding in front of the district court. His father turns up with a large battalion of police officers, while Shiva turns up with a much large number of students. The film ends with their wedding successfully happening, and Mayandi giving his blessings.

Cast
 Jithan Ramesh as Shiva
 Saloni Aswani as Priya
 Lal as Mayandi
 Telangana Shakuntala as Mayandi's sister
 Vennira Aadai Moorthy as College principal
 Cochin Haneefa as Teacher
 Avinash as Vishvanathan, Shiva's father
 Manobala as Shiva's grandfather
 Ganja Karuppu as himself
 Kanal Kannan as himself
 Robo Shankar as himself
 Suja Varunee as Sunitha (special appearance)
 Mumaith Khan as Special appearance
Pazhaya Joke Thangadurai as Shiva's friend (uncredited)

Soundtrack
Songs composed by Srikanth Deva. Director Perarasu wrote the lyrics for one song. The song "Kaalaiyum Neeye" is based on Telugu song "Cheppave Prema" from Manasantha Nuvve.

Reception
Sify wrote "It is a crass film that drags with plenty of double entendre and inane songs tuned by Sreekanth Deva." Filmibeat wrote "The film is made on a reasonable story, but the way the director presents the story is truly horrible".

References

External links
 Newstoday film review

2007 films
Tamil remakes of Telugu films
2000s Tamil-language films
Films scored by Srikanth Deva